David Walter Foster  (born November 1, 1949) is a Canadian musician, composer, arranger, record producer and music executive who chaired Verve Records from 2012 to 2016. He has won 16 Grammy Awards from 47 nominations. His music career spans more than five decades, mainly beginning in the early 1970s as a keyboardist for the pop group Skylark.

Early life and career
Foster was born in Victoria, British Columbia, the son of Maurice "Maury" Foster, an office worker, and Eleanor May Foster (née Vantreight), a homemaker. In 1963, at the age of 13, he enrolled in the University of Washington music program. In 1965, he auditioned to lead the band in an Edmonton nightclub owned by jazz musician Tommy Banks. Banks mentored Foster in jazz, producing records, and the music business. After one year there, he moved to Toronto to play with Ronnie Hawkins. In 1966, he joined a backup band for Chuck Berry. In 1974, he moved to Los Angeles with his band Skylark.

Career

Early years
Foster was a keyboardist for the pop group Skylark, discovered by Eirik Wangberg. The song "Wildflower" was a top ten hit in 1973. When the group disbanded, Foster remained in Los Angeles and, together with Jay Graydon, he formed the band Airplay. In 1975, Foster played on George Harrison's album Extra Texture. He followed that up a year later by playing the Fender Rhodes and clavinet on Harrison's album Thirty Three & 1/3. In 1976, Foster joined Guthrie Thomas on Thomas' second Capitol Records album, Lies and Alibis, with Ringo Starr and a host of other performers. Foster was a major contributor to the 1979 Earth, Wind & Fire album I Am, as a studio player and arranger. He was a co-writer on six of the album's tracks, such as "After the Love Has Gone", for which he and his co-writers, Graydon and Bill Champlin, won the 1980 Grammy Award for Best R&B Song.

1981–1999
Foster worked as a producer on albums for The Tubes: 1981's The Completion Backward Principle and 1983's Outside Inside. Foster co-wrote such songs as "Talk to Ya Later", with Tubes singer Fee Waybill and Steve Lukather from Toto; the Top 40 hit "Don't Want to Wait Anymore"; and the number 10 US hit "She's a Beauty". On the 1980 Boz Scaggs album Middle Man, he co-wrote and he played keyboard on some of Scaggs's most successful songs, including "Breakdown Dead Ahead", "Jojo", and "Simone", followed by "Look What You've Done to Me" from the film Urban Cowboy.

Foster was a major contributor to the career of jazz rock band Chicago in the early and middle 1980s, having worked as the band's producer on Chicago 16 (1982), Chicago 17 (1984 - their biggest selling, multi-platinum album), and Chicago 18 (1986). As was typical of his producing projects from this period, Foster was a co-writer on "Hard to Say I'm Sorry" (US No. 1), "Love Me Tomorrow" (US No. 22), "Stay the Night" (US No. 16), and "You're the Inspiration" (US No. 3). These were co-written with the band's bassist Peter Cetera. In 1986, Foster also helped Cetera co-write (along with Cetera's wife Diane Nini) his US No. 1 solo hit "Glory of Love".

Foster co-wrote Kenny Loggins's songs "Heart to Heart" (US No. 15), from the 1982 album High Adventure, and "Forever" (US No. 40), from the 1985 album Vox Humana.

Foster worked with country singer Kenny Rogers on the hit albums What About Me? (1984) and The Heart of the Matter (1985). The latter features "The Best of Me", co-written with Richard Marx that was covered by Cliff Richard in 1989, resulting in a number-two UK hit.

That year, Foster composed the score for the film St. Elmo's Fire, including the instrumental "Love Theme from St. Elmo's Fire", which hit No. 15 on the US pop charts. Another song from the film, "St. Elmo's Fire (Man in Motion)", recorded by John Parr, reached No. 1 on the Billboard Hot 100 on September 7, 1985.

In 1985, Foster also co-wrote and produced "Tears Are Not Enough", which reached top 15 status. The album was recorded by a group of fellow Canadian artists including Joni Mitchell, Neil Young, and  Bryan Adams.

Foster continued turning out occasional film scores, including the Michael J. Fox comedy The Secret of My Success (1987), which featured a song co-written by Foster titled "The Price of Love", a version of which was performed by Roger Daltrey on his album Can't Wait to See the Movie, which Foster also produced. Foster wrote the score for the Jodie Foster-Mark Harmon film Stealing Home (1988). Both films spawned soundtrack albums with Foster's prominent contributions.

Foster composed "Winter Games", the instrumental theme song for the 1988 Winter Olympics and performed "Winter Games" and its vocal version "Can't You Feel It?" in Calgary, Alberta. "Winter Games" is the soundtrack for fountain shows at the Bellagio resort in Las Vegas.

Foster collaborated with then-wife Linda Thompson on the song "I Have Nothing", sung by Whitney Houston in the 1992 film The Bodyguard. The couple appeared in the film's Oscars scene as the conductor and an Academy member.

In 1995, Foster signed a deal with Warner Brothers for his own boutique label, 143 Records, as a joint venture with Warner. Foster gave responsibility for running the label to then-manager Brian Avnet. One of the label's first signings was a then-little known Irish folk-rock band, The Corrs, whose debut album he produced. By 1997, Foster decided that, in the American market at least, "logo labels" like 143 were in a "bad spot", so he sold the label back to Warner and became a senior vice president at the corporation. Foster and Kenneth "Babyface" Edmonds composed "The Power of the Dream", the official song of the 1996 Summer Olympics. Foster produced the Diane Warren songs "Un-Break My Heart" sung by Toni Braxton, "Because You Loved Me" sung by Celine Dion, and "Have You Ever?" sung by Brandy.

2000s
Foster produced major-label debut albums for Josh Groban (2001), Michael Bublé (2003), Renee Olstead (2004), and Charice (2010), which were released under his 143 Records.

In 2001, Foster collaborated with Lara Fabian and the Vancouver Symphony Orchestra to record English-language, French-language, and bilingual versions of the Canadian national anthem, "O Canada", for a promotion of the Canadian government. Foster, with his then-wife Linda Thompson, composed "Light the Fire Within", sung by LeAnn Rimes for the 2002 Winter Olympics. In 2003, Foster won an Emmy Award for Outstanding Music and Lyrics for The Concert for World Children's Day. His song, "I Will Be There With You" (sung with Katharine McPhee), has been used by Japan Airlines to promote the introduction of new aircraft for its US flights.

The 2001 film The Score, starring Robert De Niro and Marlon Brando, features a Diana Krall recording, "I'll Make it Up as I Go". The song was composed by Foster together with his daughter Amy Foster-Gillies.

In 2005, Foster, his daughter Amy Foster-Gillies, and Beyoncé wrote "Stand Up For Love" as the anthem to the World Children's Day, an annual worldwide event to raise awareness and funds for children's causes. Over the years, more than $50 million has been raised to benefit Ronald McDonald House Charities and other children's organizations.

In 2008, Foster held a one-night concert called Hitman: David Foster & Friends at the Mandalay Bay resort in Las Vegas featuring Foster presiding center stage at the keyboard, Andrea Bocelli, Michael Bublé, Josh Groban, Peter Cetera, Katharine McPhee, Celine Dion, Blake Shelton, Brian McKnight, and Charice.

In 2009, it was revealed by songwriter Diane Warren that she had worked with Foster to produce tracks for Whitney Houston's upcoming album and the singer's comeback single would be the Foster-produced "I Didn't Know My Own Strength".

2010s
On December 15, 2011, it was confirmed that Foster would become the Chairman of Verve Music Group.

In 2013, Foster produced Mary J. Blige's first Christmas album A Mary Christmas released October 15 of that year. The album includes 12 classics such as swing-styled "Rudolph the Red-Nosed Reindeer". It features artists Marc Anthony, Jessie J, The Clark Sisters, Barbra Streisand, and Chris Botti. Foster produced Andrea Bocelli's album, Passione, released in January 2013. The album is a collection of Mediterranean love songs featuring duets with Jennifer Lopez, Nelly Furtado, and a virtual duet with Edith Piaf.

Foster produced an album with Bryan Adams titled Tracks of My Years released in 2014.

Foster left Verve in 2016 in a label reorganization.

As of 2018, he was writing a musical about Betty Boop with Susan Birkenhead, along with a musical with Jewel, based on Amy Bloom's novel Lucky Us.

Television appearances
In 1992, Foster went to Indonesia to record the TV show David Foster's Twilight Orchestra on the national television station RCTI. In early 2001, Foster appeared in Popstars, a WB reality series aimed at coming up with the next girl group. The result was Eden's Crush (featuring Nicole Scherzinger). Foster and Linda Thompson wrote and produced several songs on their album.

In 2005, his and Linda Thompson's home life was featured in a Fox-staged reality television show, The Princes of Malibu. He attempted to teach his spoiled stepsons, Brandon and Brody Jenner – the children of Thompson and Olympian Caitlyn Jenner – to straighten their lives up and earn their own way.

In late April 2006, he appeared as a guest mentor on American Idol and as a guest judge on Nashville Star. In 2006, he was a judge on the FOX TV show Celebrity Duets and appeared on Star Tomorrow, for which auditions were held in Los Angeles and New York for undiscovered talent.

In July 2006, Foster made a brief appearance on The View as Star Jones's vocal coach. In August 2006, he was the musical director for JCPenney Jam's The Concert For American Kids. Also in 2006, Foster was featured in Under the Desert Sky, Andrea Bocceli's live album and DVD of a pop concert held in Las Vegas. In 2007, Foster was featured in Bocelli's Vivere Live in Tuscany, a live album and DVD of a pop concert performed at Bocelli's Teatro del Silenzio in Lajatico, Tuscany in July. In November 2007, Foster appeared in The Oprah Winfrey Shows annual "Favorite Things" episode, performing with Josh Groban.

In September 2008, singer Charice joined Foster on The Oprah Winfrey Show with Celine Dion via satellite; and on October 31, he and Andrea Bocelli appeared on Oprah again together, where he stated that Bocelli was his "favourite singer on the planet".

In December 2008, Foster was featured in a PBS special titled Hit Man: David Foster & Friends, a concert featuring live performances by Foster and numerous other performers.

Later in 2011, he was featured in Andrea Bocelli's live album, Concerto: One Night in Central Park (also known as Live in Central Park) and in Bocelli's four PBS specials. Bocelli also performed during Foster's Hit Man special.

In late 2012, Foster appeared in an episode of The Real Housewives of Beverly Hills. His wife, Yolanda Foster, joined the cast of season three.

In 2015, Foster joined the panel of judges for Asia's Got Talent. In 2017 and 2019, he returned as judge with Anggun, Mel C, and Vanness Wu for the second season and third season with Anggun and Jay Park, and also judged the Chinese-language World's Got Talent.

In 2019, PBS hosted An Intimate Evening with David Foster. The show includes his wife Katharine McPhee, tenor Fernando Varela, Pia Toscano, Loren Allred, and Shelea.

In 2019, the acclaimed biographical documentary, David Foster: Off the Record was produced and directed by Barry Avrich. It debuted at the Toronto International Film Festival in September 2019. It includes archival footage and interviews, and appearances by singers including Barbra Streisand, Michael Bublé, Josh Groban, and Celine Dion.

In 2021, Foster and McPhee competed in season six of The Masked Singer as "Banana Split". They were eliminated in the Group B Finale, where they competed against Jewel.

Christmas album productions
Foster has produced multiple best-selling Christmas albums beginning with Once Upon a Christmas, by Kenny Rogers and Dolly Parton in 1984. He produced Celine Dion's These Are Special Times (1998), Josh Groban's Noël (2007), Andrea Bocelli's My Christmas (2009), Michael Bublé's Christmas (2011), Rod Stewart's Merry Christmas, Baby (2012), Mary J. Blige's A Mary Christmas (2013), and Jordan Smith's 'Tis the Season (2016). Thus, he has produced the best-selling Christmas albums of 1984, 1998, 2007–09, and 2011–12. Four of these albums rank among the top fifteen best-selling Christmas albums ever.  He composed "Grown-Up Christmas List" (1990).

Foster and his fifth wife Katharine McPhee recorded a seven-song Christmas EP called Christmas Songs in 2022.

Philanthropy
Foster created the David Foster Foundation, which supports children in need of medical transplants, for which he was acknowledged in the Juno Awards 2019. He is an ardent supporter of Israel, raising money for their military at fundraisers.

Personal life
Foster has been married five times and has five daughters, one son, and seven grandchildren. His first child, Allison Jones Foster was born in 1970 when Foster was 20. He placed her for adoption and reconnected with her when she was 30. His first marriage was to singer and writer B.J. Cook. Cook and Foster had one daughter together, Amy Skylark (b. 1973), a songwriter and author.

He married his second wife, Rebecca Dyer, on October 27, 1982, and they divorced in 1986. They had three daughters: Sara (b. 1981), Erin (b. 1982), and Jordan. Foster is the father-in-law of former professional tennis player Tommy Haas, who is married to Sara.

He married his third wife, actress Linda Thompson, in 1991 and divorced in 2005. The two became a songwriting team, collaborating on several songs, including "I Have Nothing", performed by Whitney Houston in The Bodyguard (1992), and "Grown-Up Christmas List". Foster was stepfather to Brody and Brandon Jenner (Linda's sons with Caitlyn Jenner), who both grew up living in his Malibu home.  Both Jenner boys starred in a short-lived TV reality show called The Princes of Malibu in 2005 which also featured Foster and Thompson and was filmed in Foster's and Thompson's home.

In 1992, Foster was driving on the Pacific Coast Highway when his car struck actor and dancer Ben Vereen, who had just suffered a stroke while driving near his Malibu home and was stumbling on the highway. Vereen was critically injured, but recovered after going through physical rehabilitation. Vereen said afterward that he would have died if Foster had not collided with him, and then called for emergency services.

Foster married his fourth wife, Dutch model Yolanda Hadid, in Beverly Hills, California on November 11, 2011. David had three stepchildren from Yolanda Foster's previous marriage to Mohamed Hadid: Gigi (b. 1995), Bella (b. 1996), and Anwar (b. 1999). On December 1, 2015, Foster announced that after four years of marriage and nine years together, he and Yolanda had made the decision to divorce. The divorce was finalized on October 16, 2017.

In June 2018, Foster became engaged to Katharine McPhee. On June 28, 2019, the couple wed at the Armenian Church of St Yeghiche, South Kensington in London. McPhee gave birth to a son, Rennie David, in February 2021.

Foster's sister, producer Jaymes Foster, has a son with Clay Aiken. He is a cousin of racecar driver Billy Foster.

Discography

 The Best of Me (1983)
 David Foster (1986)
 The Symphony Sessions (1988)
 River of Love (1990)
 Rechordings (1991)
 The Christmas Album (1993)
 Love Lights the World (1994)
 Eleven Words (2020)
 Christmas Songs (2022)

Collaborations 

Backup Band for Chuck Berry,   Ronnie Hawkins and Bo Diddley (1966–1970)
 Skylark  - Skylark (1972)
 Goodnight Vienna - Ringo Starr (1974)
 The Hungry Years - Neil Sedaka (1975)
 Kim Carnes - Kim Carnes (1975)
 Extra Texture (Read All About It) - George Harrison (1975)
 Nigel Olsson - Nigel Olsson (1975)
 Nuthin’ Fancy - Lynyrd Skynyrd (1975)
 The Main Refrain - Wendy Waldman (1976)
 Slow Down World - Donovan (1976)
 Thirty Three & 1/3 - George Harrison (1976)
 A Night on the Town - Rod Stewart (1976)
 Lisa Dal Bello - Dalbello (1977)
 Figli delle stelle - Alan Sorrenti (1977)
 The Music Man - Paul Anka (1977)
 Here You Come Again - Dolly Parton (1977)
 Southern Nights - Glen Campbell (1977)
 Foot Loose & Fancy Free - Rod Stewart (1977)
 Ringo the 4th - Ringo Starr (1977)
 Along the Red Ledge - Daryl Hall & John Oates (1978)
 Bish - Stephen Bishop (1978)
 Nigel Olsson - Nigel Olsson (1978)
 Heartbreaker - Dolly Parton (1978)
 Totally Hot - Olivia Newton-John (1978)
 From the Inside - Alice Cooper (1978)
 Off the Wall - Michael Jackson (1979)
 In Love - Cheryl Lynn (1979)
 Headlines - Paul Anka (1979)
 When Love Comes Calling - Deniece Williams (1979)
 Great Balls of Fire - Dolly Parton (1979)
 I Am  - Earth, Wind & Fire (1979)
 Middle Man - Boz Scaggs (1980)
 Shine - Average White Band (1980)
 Aretha - Aretha Franklin (1980)
 Airplay  - Airplay (1980)
 He Who Rides the Tiger - Bernie Taupin (1980)
 This Time - Al Jarreau (1980)
 Bi-Coastal - Peter Allen (1980)
 Faces  - Earth, Wind & Fire (1980)
  - Mariya Takeuchi (1980)
 What Cha' Gonna Do for Me - Chaka Khan (1981)
 Love All the Hurt Away - Aretha Franklin (1981)
 It's the World Gone Crazy - Glen Campbell (1981)
 The Dude  - Quincy Jones (1981)
 Sometimes Late at Night - Carole Bayer Sager (1981)
 Every Home Should Have One  - Patti Austin (1981)
 Breakin' Away - Al Jarreau (1981)
 The Completion Backward Principle  - The Tubes (1981)
 Raise!  - Earth, Wind & Fire (1981)
 Lite Me Up - Herbie Hancock (1982)
 Friends in Love - Dionne Warwick (1982)
 High Adventure - Kenny Loggins (1982)
 Heartlight - Neil Diamond (1982)
 Donna Summer - Donna Summer (1982)
 Thriller - Michael Jackson (1982)
 Chicago 16  - Chicago (1982)
 Angel Heart - Jimmy Webb (1982)
 Feel My Soul - Jennifer Holliday (1983)
 It's Your Night  - James Ingram (1983)
 We've Got Tonight - Kenny Rogers (1983)
 Outside Inside - The Tubes (1983)
 Dirty Looks - Juice Newton (1983)
 The Wild Heart - Stevie Nicks (1983)
 Walk a Fine Line - Paul Anka (1983)
 Electric Universe  - Earth, Wind & Fire (1983) 
 Two Eyes - Brenda Russell (1983)
 Not the Boy Next Door - Peter Allen (1983)
 Can't Slow Down - Lionel Richie (1983)
 Jarreau - Al Jarreau (1983)
 Daydream Coast - Naoko Kawai (1984)
 Chicago 17  - Chicago (1984)
 Read My Lips - Fee Waybill (1984)
 Primitive - Neil Diamond (1984)
 High Crime  - Al Jarreau (1984)
 What About Me? - Kenny Rogers (1984)
 I Feel for You - Chaka Khan (1984)
 Once Upon a Christmas - Kenny Rogers, Dolly Parton (1984)
 Friends - Dionne Warwick (1985)
 "The Broadway Album" - Barbra Streisand (1985)
 Vox Humana - Kenny Loggins (1985)
 Watching You Watching Me - Bill Withers (1985)
 9 1/2 NINE HALF - Naoko Kawai (1985)
 The Heart of the Matter - Kenny Rogers (1985)
 Rhythm of the Night  - DeBarge (1985)
 Here's the World for Ya  - Payolas (1985)
 Chicago 18  - Chicago (1986)
 Winner in You - Patti LaBelle (1986)
 Now and Forever (You and Me) - Anne Murray (1986)
 Headed for the Future - Neil Diamond (1986)
 East of Midnight - Gordon Lightfoot (1986)
 Precious Moments - Jermaine Jackson (1986)
 Reservations for Two - Dionne Warwick (1987)
 The Best Years of Our Lives - Neil Diamond (1988)
 Lefty - Art Garfunkel (1988)
 Somebody Loves You - Paul Anka (1989)
 Through the Storm - Aretha Franklin (1989)
 Flowers in the Dirt - Paul McCartney (1989)
 Unison - Céline Dion (1990)
 What You See Is What You Sweat - Aretha Franklin (1991)
 Unforgettable... with Love  - Natalie Cole (1991)
 Leap of Faith - Kenny Loggins (1991)
 The Bodyguard: Original Soundtrack Album - Whitney Houston/various artists (1992)
 World Falling Down - Peter Cetera (1992)
 Timeless: The Classics - Michael Bolton (1992)
 Soul Dancing - Taylor Dayne (1993)
 Airplay For The Planet  - Jay Graydon (1993)
 The One Thing - Michael Bolton (1993)
 The Colour of My Love - Céline Dion (1993)
 Through the Fire - Peabo Bryson (1994)
 My Cherie - Sheena Easton (1995)
 Something to Remember - Madonna (1995)
 Falling into You - Céline Dion (1996)
 Stardust - Natalie Cole (1996)
 Open Road - Gary Barlow (1997)
 Let's Talk About Love - Céline Dion (1997)
 Higher Ground - Barbra Streisand (1997)
 Bathhouse Betty - Bette Midler (1998)
 A Body of Work - Paul Anka (1998)
 Back with a Heart - Olivia Newton-John (1998)
 A Love Like Ours - Barbra Streisand (1999)
 Rainbow - Mariah Carey (1999)
 The Heat - Toni Braxton (2000)
 Josh Groban - Josh Groban (2001)
 Christmas Memories - Barbra Streisand (2001)
 Enchantment - Charlotte Church (2001)
 A New Day Has Come - Céline Dion (2002)
 Closer - Josh Groban (2003)
 Michael Bublé - Michael Bublé (2003)
 Blue Skies - Diana DeGarmo (2004)
 Miracle - Céline Dion (2004)
 It's Time - Michael Bublé (2005)
 Awake - Josh Groban (2006)
 East of Angel Town - Peter Cincotti (2007)
 Call Me Irresponsible - Michael Bublé (2007)
 Soul - Seal (2008)
 Skylark - Renee Olstead (2009)
 Crazy Love - Michael Bublé (2009)
 Soul 2 - Seal (2011)
 Christmas - Michael Bublé (2011)
 Merry Christmas, Baby - Rod Stewart (2012)
 Tracks of My Years - Bryan Adams (2014)
 Wallflower - Diana Krall (2015)
 Love - Michael Bublé (2018)
"Sorrows" - Bryson Tiller (2020)

Awards and nominations

 Order of British Columbia (1995)
 Hon. Doctorate University of Victoria (1995)
 Order of Canada (1998)
 Canadian Walk of Fame Inductee (2002)
 Hon. Doctorate of Music Berklee College of Music (2002)
 Officer of the Order of Canada (2006)
 Canadian Music Hall of Fame Inductee (2007)
 Canadian Songwriters Hall of Fame Inductee (2010)
 Songwriters Hall of Fame Inductee (2010)
 Hollywood Walk of Fame Star (2013) (located near the Capitol Records Building)
 Governor General Performing Arts Awards (2022)
In 1985, Rolling Stone magazine named Foster the "master of ... bombastic pop kitsch". Foster has won 16 Grammy Awards, including three Grammy Awards for Producer of the Year and has been nominated a total of 47 times.  He has been nominated three times for an Academy Award for Best Original Song and won the 1999 Golden Globe Award for Best Original Song for the song "The Prayer" (sung by Andrea Bocelli and Celine Dion) from the film Quest for Camelot. He has been named BMI's "Songwriter of the Year".

See also

 List of songs written by David Foster
 Music of Canada
 Canadian Music Hall of Fame
 List of Canadian composers
 Miss M – Mariya Takeuchi

References

Further reading

External links

 Official website
 
 David Foster on The Hour
 

1949 births
Living people
20th-century Canadian composers
20th-century Canadian male musicians
20th-century Canadian male writers
21st-century Canadian composers
21st-century Canadian conductors (music)
21st-century Canadian keyboardists
21st-century Canadian male musicians
21st-century Canadian male writers
21st-century organists
Canadian expatriate musicians in the United States
Canadian film score composers
Canadian humanitarians
Canadian male composers
Canadian music arrangers
Canadian Music Hall of Fame inductees
Canadian music industry executives
Canadian organists
Canadian people of English descent
Canadian people of Irish descent
Canadian people of Scottish descent
Canadian philanthropists
Canadian record producers
Canadian songwriters
Emmy Award winners
Fellows of the Royal Conservatory of Music
Golden Globe Award-winning musicians
Grammy Award winners
Jack Richardson Producer of the Year Award winners
Juno Award for Instrumental Album of the Year winners
Male conductors (music)
Male film score composers
Male organists
Members of the Order of British Columbia
Musicians from Victoria, British Columbia
Officers of the Order of Canada
Skylark (Canadian band) members
Verve Records artists
Writers from Victoria, British Columbia